Zoo Corporation is a Japanese company that develops medical prescription systems and video games.

History
Zoo was founded on April 8, 1986 by Jinichi Miyajima.

Video games

Localized Games

References

External links
Zoo Corporation official website (Japanese)
Zoo Corporation at MobyGames

Companies based in Nagano Prefecture
Video game companies established in 1986
Amusement companies of Japan
Video game companies of Japan
Video game development companies
Video game publishers
Japanese companies established in 1986